The Anti-Masonic Party was the earliest third party in the United States. Formally a single-issue party, it strongly opposed Freemasonry in the United States. It was active from the late 1820s, especially in the Northeast, and later attempted to become a major party by expanding its platform to take positions on other issues. It declined quickly after 1832  as most members joined the new Whig Party; it disappeared after 1838.

The party was founded following the disappearance of William Morgan, a former Mason who had become a prominent critic of the Masonic organization. Many believed that Masons had murdered Morgan for speaking out against Masonry and subsequently many churches and other groups condemned Masonry. As many Masons were prominent businessmen and politicians, the backlash against the Masons was also a form of anti-elitism. The Anti-Masons purported that Masons posed a threat to American republicanism by secretly trying to control the government. Furthermore, there was a strong fear that Masonry was hostile to Christianity.

Mass opposition to Masonry eventually coalesced into a political party. Before and during the presidency of John Quincy Adams, there was a period of political realignment. The Anti-Masons emerged as an important third-party alternative to Andrew Jackson's Democrats and Adams' National Republicans. In New York, the Anti-Masons supplanted the National Republicans as the primary opposition to the Democrats.

After experiencing unexpected success in the 1828 elections, the Anti-Masons adopted positions on other issues, most notably support for internal improvements and a protective tariff. Several Anti-Masons, including William A. Palmer and Joseph Ritner, won election to prominent positions. In states such as Pennsylvania and Rhode Island, the party controlled the balance of power in the state legislature and provided crucial support to candidates for the United States Senate. In 1831, the party held the first presidential nominating convention, a practice that was subsequently adopted by all major parties. Delegates chose former U.S. Attorney General William Wirt as their standard bearer in the 1832 presidential election; Wirt won 7.8% of the popular vote and carried Vermont.

As the 1830s progressed, many of the Anti-Masonic Party's supporters joined the Whig Party, which sought to unite those opposed to the policies of President Jackson. The Anti-Masons brought with them an intense distrust of politicians and a rejection of unthinking party loyalty, together with new campaign techniques to whip up excitement among the voters. The Anti-Masonic Party held a national convention in 1835, nominating Whig candidate William Henry Harrison, but a second convention announced that the party would not officially support a candidate. Harrison campaigned as a Whig in the 1836 presidential election and his relative success in the election encouraged further migration of Anti-Masons to the Whig Party. By 1840, the party had ceased to function as a national organization. In subsequent decades, former Anti-Masonic candidates and supporters such as Millard Fillmore, William H. Seward, Thurlow Weed and Thaddeus Stevens became prominent members of the Whig Party.

History

Background 

The opponents of Freemasonry formed a political movement after the Morgan affair convinced them the Masons were murdering men who spoke out against them. This key episode was the mysterious 1826 disappearance of William Morgan, a Freemason in upstate New York who had turned against the Masons.

Morgan claimed to have been made a member of the Masons while living in Canada and he appears to have briefly attended a lodge in Rochester.  In 1825, Morgan received the Royal Arch degree at Le Roy's Western Star Chapter #33, having declared under oath that he had previously received the six degrees which preceded it. Whether he actually received these degrees and if so from where has not been determined for certain.

Morgan then attempted unsuccessfully to help establish or visit lodges and chapters in Batavia, but was denied participation in Batavia's Masonic activities by members who were uncertain about Morgan's character and claims to Masonic membership. Angered by the rejection, Morgan announced that he was going to publish an exposé titled Illustrations of Masonry, critical of the Freemasons and describing their secret degree ceremonies in detail.

When his intentions became known to the Batavia lodge, an attempt was made to burn down the business of the printer who planned to publish Morgan's book. In September 1826, Morgan was arrested on flimsy allegations of failing to repay a loan and theft of a shirt and tie in an effort to prevent publication of his book by keeping him in jail. The individual who intended to publish Morgan's book paid his bail and he was released from custody. Shortly afterwards, Morgan disappeared.

Some skeptics argued that Morgan had left the Batavia area on his own, either because he had been paid not to publish his book, or to escape Masonic retaliation for attempting to publish the book, or to generate publicity that would boost the book's sales. The generally believed version of events was that Masons killed Morgan by drowning him in the Niagara River.  Whether he fled or was murdered, Morgan's disappearance led many to believe that Freemasonry was in conflict with good citizenship.

Because judges, businessmen, bankers and politicians were often Masons, ordinary citizens began to think of it as an elitist group. Moreover, many claimed that the lodges' secret oaths bound Masons to favor each other against outsiders in the courts and elsewhere.

Because some trials of alleged Morgan conspirators were mishandled and the Masons resisted further inquiries, many New Yorkers concluded that Masons controlled key offices and used their official authority to promote the goals of the fraternity by ensuring that Morgan's supposed killers escaped punishment. When a member sought to reveal its secrets, so ran the conclusion, the Freemasons had done away with him. Because they controlled the courts and other offices, they were considered capable of obstructing the investigation. True Americans, they said, had to organize and defeat this conspiracy. If good government was to be restored "all Masons must be purged from public office".

Party foundation 

The Anti-Masonic Party was formed in Upstate New York in February 1828. Anti-Masons were opponents of Freemasonry, believing that it was a corrupt and elitist secret society which was ruling much of the country in defiance of republican principles.  Many people regarded the Masonic organization and its adherents involved in government as corrupt.

Opposition to Masonry was taken up by some evangelical Protestant churches as a religious cause, particularly in the Burned-over district of upstate New York. Many churches passed resolutions condemning ministers and lay leaders who were Masons and several denominations condemned Freemasonry, including the Presbyterian, Congregational, Methodist and Baptist churches.

Anti-Masonry became a political issue in Western New York, where early in 1827 many mass meetings resolved not to support Masons for public office. In New York, the supporters of President John Quincy Adams, called "Adams men", or Anti-Jacksonians, or National Republicans, were a feeble organization. Adams supporters used the strong anti-Masonic feeling to create a new party in opposition to the rising Jacksonian Democracy nationally and the Albany Regency political organization of Martin Van Buren in New York. In this effort, they were aided by the fact that Andrew Jackson was a high-ranking Mason and frequently spoke in praise of the organization. The alleged remark of Anti-Masonic organizer Thurlow Weed (which Weed denied), that an unidentified corpse found in the Niagara River was "a good enough Morgan" until after the 1828 elections, summarized the value of the Morgan disappearance for the opponents of Jackson.

Political rise 
In the elections of 1828, the new party proved unexpectedly strong. Though its candidate for Governor of New York, Solomon Southwick, was defeated, the Anti-Masonic Party became the main opposition party to the Jacksonian Democrats in New York. In 1829, it broadened its issues base when it became a champion of internal improvements and the protective tariff.

Anti-Masonic Party members expanded the use of party-affiliated newspapers for political organizing by publishing over 100, including Southwick's National Observer and Weed's Anti-Masonic Enquirer. By 1829, Weed's Albany Journal had become the preeminent Anti-Masonic paper and it later became the leading Whig newspaper. The newspapers of the time reveled in partisanship and one brief paragraph in an Albany Journal article opposing Martin Van Buren included the words "dangerous", "demagogue", "corrupt", "degrade", "pervert", "prostitute", "debauch" and "cursed".

Conventions and elections 
A national Anti-Masonic organization was planned as early as 1827, when the New York leaders attempted unsuccessfully to persuade Henry Clay to renounce his Masonic membership and head the movement.

By 1830, the Anti-Masonic movement's effort to broaden its appeal enabled it to spread to neighboring states, becoming especially strong in Pennsylvania and Vermont.  In 1831, William A. Palmer was elected Governor of Vermont on an Anti-Masonic ticket, an office he held until 1835. Palmer's brother-in-law Augustine Clarke was an Anti-Masonic presidential elector in 1832, served as Vermont state treasurer from 1833 to 1837 and was appointed to the Anti-Masonic National Committee in 1837. Other Vermont Anti-Masonic electors in 1832 included former governor Ezra Butler and former United States representative William Strong.

The highest elected office held by a member of the Anti-Masonic Party was governor. Besides Palmer in Vermont, Joseph Ritner was the governor of Pennsylvania from 1835 to 1839.

In addition to Palmer and Ritner, Silas H. Jennison, an Anti-Mason, was elected Lieutenant Governor of Vermont with Whig support in 1835. No candidate, including Palmer, received a majority of votes for governor as required by the Vermont Constitution. The contest then moved to the Vermont General Assembly, which could not choose a winner. The General Assembly then opted to allow Jennison to act as governor until the next election. He won election as governor in his own right as a Whig in 1836 and served from 1836 to 1841.

Though the Anti-Masonic Party elected no senators and controlled no houses of a state legislature, Anti-Masons in state legislatures sometimes formed coalitions to elect senators and organize their chambers. Examples include: William Wilkins, elected to the Senate in 1830 by a coalition of Democrats and Anti-Masons in the Pennsylvania General Assembly; and William Sprague, elected Speaker of the Rhode Island House of Representatives in 1831 by a coalition of Democrats and Anti-Masons.

The Anti-Masonic Party conducted the first presidential nominating convention in the United States history for the 1832 elections, nominating William Wirt (a former Mason) for President and Amos Ellmaker for Vice President in Baltimore. Wirt won 7.78 percent of the popular vote and the seven electoral votes of Vermont. Soon the Democrats and Whigs recognized the convention's value in managing parties and campaigns and began to hold their own.

Following Ritner's election in 1835, a state convention was held in Harrisburg on December 14–17, 1835 to choose presidential electors for the 1836 election. The convention nominated William Henry Harrison for president and Francis Granger for vice president. The Vermont state Anti-Masonic convention followed suit on February 24, 1836. Anti-Masonic leaders were unable to obtain assurance from Harrison that he was not a Mason, so they called a national convention. The second national Anti-Masonic nominating convention was held in Philadelphia on May 4, 1836. The meeting was divisive, but a majority of the delegates officially stated that the party was not sponsoring a national ticket for the presidential election of 1836 and proposed a meeting in 1837 to discuss the future of the party.

Although Harrison lost the election to Democratic candidate Martin Van Buren in 1836, his strength throughout the North was hailed by Anti-Masonic leaders because the Anti-Masonic Party was the first to officially place his name in contention. By the mid-1830s, other Anti-Jacksonians had coalesced into the Whig Party, which had a broader issue base than the Anti-Masons. By the late 1830s, many of the Anti-Masonic movement's members were moving to the Whigs, regarding that party as a better alternative to the Jacksonians, by then called Democrats. The Anti-Masonic Party held a conference in September 1837 to discuss its situation—one delegate was former president John Quincy Adams.

The Anti-Masonic Party held a third national nominating convention at Temperance Hall in Philadelphia on November 13–14, 1838. By this time, the party had been almost entirely supplanted by the Whigs. The Anti-Masons unanimously endorsed William Henry Harrison for president and Daniel Webster for vice president in the 1840 election. When the Whig National Convention nominated Harrison with John Tyler as his running mate, the Anti-Masonic Party did not make an alternate nomination and ceased to function, with most adherents being fully absorbed into the Whigs by 1840.

Legacy 

Anti-Masonry was deeply committed to conspiracy theories, primarily the claim that Masonic elites were trying to secretly control the government. As people became more mobile economically during the Industrial Revolution and began to move west when new states were populated by white settlers and added to the Union, the growth of the Anti-Masonic movement was caused by the political and social unrest resulting from the weakening of longstanding family and community ties. With Freemasonry one of the few institutions that remained stable during this time of change, it became a natural target for protesters. As a result, the Morgan Affair became the highly visible catalyst that turned a popular movement into a political party.

Under the banner of Anti-Masons, able leaders united Anti-Jacksonians and others who were discontented with existing political conditions. The fact that William Wirt, their choice for the presidency in 1832, not only was a former Mason, but also defended Freemasonry in a speech before the convention that nominated him indicates that opposition to Masonry was not the Anti-Masonic movement's sole issue.

The Anti-Masonic movement gave rise to or expanded the use of many innovations which became accepted practice among other parties, including nominating conventions and party newspapers. In contrast to the Democrats, who stressed unwavering loyalty to the party's candidates, Anti-Masonic heritage to the Whigs included a distrust of behind-the-scenes political maneuvering by party bosses. Instead they made direct appeals to the people through gigantic rallies, parades, and rhetorical rabble-rousing. In addition, the Anti-Masons aided in the rise of the Whig Party as the major alternative to the Democrats, with conventions, newspapers and Anti-Masonic positions on issues including internal improvements and tariffs being adopted by the Whigs.

Second Anti-Masonic Party
A later political organization called the Anti-Masonic Party was active from 1872 until 1888. This second group had a more religious basis for its anti-Masonry and was closely associated with Jonathan Blanchard of Wheaton College.

Members of Congress 

The Anti-Masons did not elect anyone to the Senate, but elected several members of the House of Representatives.
 Massachusetts
 William Jackson
 John Reed Jr.

 New York
 William Babcock
 Gamaliel H. Barstow
 Timothy Childs
 John A. Collier
 Bates Cooke
 John Dickson
 Philo C. Fuller
 Gideon Hard
 Abner Hazeltine
 George W. Lay
 Henry C. Martindale
 Robert S. Rose
 Phineas L. Tracy
 Grattan H. Wheeler
 Frederick Whittlesey

 Ohio
 Jonathan Sloane

 Pennsylvania
 Robert Allison
 John Banks
 Charles Augustus Barnitz
 Richard Biddle
 George Chambers
 William Clark
 Edward Darlington
 Edward Davies
 Harmar Denny
 John Edwards
 Thomas Henry
 William Hiester
 Francis James
 Thomas McKean
 Charles Ogle
 David Potts Jr.
 Andrew Stewart

 Rhode Island
 Dutee Jerauld Pearce

 Vermont
 William Cahoon
 Benjamin F. Deming
 Henry Fisk Janes
 William Slade

Notable office holders and candidates 

 Solomon Southwick, candidate for Governor of New York (1828)
 Millard Fillmore, New York State Assembly (1829–1831)
 William H. Seward, New York State Senate (1831–1834)
 Lebbeus Egerton, Lieutenant Governor of Vermont (1831–1835)
 William A. Palmer, Governor of Vermont (1831–1835)
 William Wirt, candidate for President in 1832
 Amos Ellmaker, candidate for Vice President in 1832
 William Sprague III, Speaker of the Rhode Island House of Representatives (1832–1835)
 Thaddeus Stevens, Pennsylvania House of Representatives (1833–1835)
 Augustine Clarke, Vermont State Treasurer (1833–1837)
 Joseph Ritner, Governor of Pennsylvania (1835–1839)
 Silas H. Jennison, Governor of Vermont (1835–1841) and Anti-Mason running with Whig support who later became a Whig
 John Quincy Adams, candidate for Governor of Massachusetts in 1833
 Allen Wardner, Vermont State Treasurer (1837–1838)
 Jonathan Blanchard, candidate for president in 1884

Electoral history

Presidential elections

Congressional elections

See also
 Freemasonry in the United States

References

Sources and further reading
 Bemis, Samuel Flagg. John Quincy Adams and the union (1956) vol 2 pp 273-304.

 
 
 

 Goodman, Paul. Towards a Christian republic: Antimasonry and the great transition in New England 1826-1836 (Oxford University Press, 1988).
 Holt, Michael F. "The Antimasonic and Know Nothing Parties," in History of U.S. Political Parties, ed. Arthur M. Schlesinger Jr. (4 vols., New York, 1973), vol I, 575–620.
 .
 .
 Ratcliffe, Donald J. "Antimasonry and Partisanship in Greater New England, 1826-1836." Journal of the Early Republic 15.2 (1995): 199-239.

 Rayback, Robert J. Millard Fillmore: Biography of a President. Buffalo Historical Society.  1959. online
 Rupp, Robert O. "Parties and the public good: political Antimasonry in New York reconsidered." Journal of the Early Republic 8.3 (1988): 253-279. online
 Shade, William.  "Review: The Elder Goodman's 'Light on Antimasonry'?" Reviews in American History (1989) 17#1 pp. 58–63  in jstor; 
 
 Trefousse, Hans L. Thaddeus Stevens: Nineteenth-Century Egalitarian. University of North Carolina Press.  1997.
 Vaughn, William Preston (1983) The Antimasonic Party in the United States, 1826–1843. University Press of Kentucky. , the standard history.
 Van Deusen, Glyndon G. Thurlow Weed, Wizard of the Lobby (1947) online.

Anti-Masonry
Freemasonry in the United States
Defunct political parties in the United States
Political parties established in 1828
Political parties disestablished in 1838
Second Party System
1828 establishments in the United States
1838 disestablishments in the United States
Protestant political parties
Defunct conservative parties in the United States
Right-wing populism in the United States
Conservatism in the United States